"Sincere" is the debut single by English UK garage musician MJ Cole, released in 1998. It features Nova Casper and Jay Dee on vocals. The song initially peaked at No. 38 on the UK Singles Chart, but a re-release in 2000 containing new mixes (following the success of Cole's second single "Crazy Love") proved even more successful, peaking at No. 13. It also reached No. 1 on the UK Dance Singles Chart.

Two orchestral versions were recorded for two UK garage cover albums; the first in 2018 by the House & Garage Orchestra (featuring Camden Cox on vocals) for the album Garage Classics and the other in 2019 by DJ Spoony together with Katie Chatburn and the Ignition Orchestra (featuring Hamzaa) for Garage Classical.

Impact and legacy
In November 2016, UK duo Gorgon City compiled a list of their top UK garage songs for Billboard, with "Sincere" at #10.

The Guardian listed "Sincere" at number 2 in their list of "The best UK garage tracks - ranked!" in 2019.

In 2017, Mixmag included "Sincere" in their list of the "12 best late-90s UK garage records", and in 2019 included the song in their list of "40 of the best UK garage tracks released from 1995 to 2005".

Redbull.com included the song in their list of "10 underground UK garage classics that still sound fresh today".

Gemtracks included the song in their list of the "top UK garage songs between 1995–2005".

Track listing
UK 12" single (1998)
A1. "Sincere" (vocal mix)	
A2. "Sincere" (dub mix)	
AA1. "Sincere" (MJ's Wild Side remix)
AA2. "Sincere" (MJ's Wild Side instrumental)

UK CD single (1998)
 "Sincere" (radio edit)
 "Sincere" (vocal mix)
 "Sincere" (MJ's Wild Side remix)
 "Sincere" (The Black Science house ride)
 "Sincere" (dub mix)
 "Sincere" (The Black Science hip hop ride)

UK 12" (remixes) (2000)
A. "Sincere" (Re-Cue'd)
B. "Sincere" (Mig's Petalpusher vocal)
C. "Sincere" (Jazzanova Sincerely Yours remix)
D. "Sincere" (Naked Music Jay's Breakfast dub)

UK CD single (2000)
 "Sincere" (radio edit)
 "Sincere" (Wookie remix)
 "Sincere" (Jazzanova Sincerely Yours remix)
 Video

References

1998 songs
1998 debut singles
2000 singles
MJ Cole songs
AM PM Records singles
Talkin' Loud singles